Sanjaya Rodrigo (born 27 February 1979) is a Sri Lankan former cricketer. He played first-class cricket for several domestic teams in Sri Lanka between 1998 and 2006. He was also a part of Sri Lanka's squad for the 1998 Under-19 Cricket World Cup.

He was the first batsman in a Twenty20 (T20) to carry his bat in any form of T20 cricket when he did so in 2005 in a domestic T20 match, where he was unbeaten on 16 in the team's total of just 85. To date he is the only Sri Lankan cricketer to carry his bat in a T20 match. His innings of 16 not out is also the lowest score by any batsman in T20 cricket when carrying his bat through the innings.

References

External links
 

1979 births
Living people
Sri Lankan cricketers
Bloomfield Cricket and Athletic Club cricketers
Ragama Cricket Club cricketers
Sportspeople from Galle